The Tamsui line was a Taiwanese railroad branch line, located in the cities of Taipei and New Taipei and operated by the Taiwan Railways Administration (TRA). It connected the city of Taipei with the town of Tamsui. The route is currently served by the Taipei Metro Tamsui–Xinyi line.

History

After Japan gradually occupied Taiwan in 1895 (during Japanese rule), the main transportation port was still the Port of Damtsui.  Traditionally, materials were transported from Damtsui Port "upriver" in small canoes.  To improve the surface transport capacity from Damtsui Port to Taihoku and the rest of Taiwan, the Ministry of Railways in the Taiwan Directorate-General arranged to utilize the railway materials reclaimed from the reconstruction of the Taihoku-Shinchiku segment of the Ching-dynasty West Coast Main Line to survey and layout a railway line along the east bank of the Damtsui river.  This became known as the Damtsui Line.  The construction cost of the Damtsui Line was much less than the original plan, costing only 720,000 yen.  This line was also used to transport new railway construction materials imported from Japan, and ballast stone from a quarry near Shirin.

The Tamsui Line officially opened on 25 August 1901, with five stations (see initial timetable below).  Eventually a total of 17 stations were operational, two of which (Dadaocheng, Beimen), located south of Taipei Railway Station were closed to passenger traffic by 1916 and 1923 respectively (the former station, located on a branch, continued to be used by freight trains until 1937). Changan and Jiantan Stations were shut down in 1950. In 1954 a temporary Fuxinggang Station was built for the 9th annual Taiwan Province Games, which closed after the games ended. A spur track known as the Asia Branch Line located before Tamsui Station provided access to the British Merchant Warehouse operated by Royal Dutch Shell, which was closed in 1971 and the surviving track was heritage-listed along with the British Merchant Warehouse in 2000. In addition, Tatung Company had a station located between Shuanglian and Yuanshan Stations, which was originally built during World War II, finally opened on 7 October 1946 and closed on 1 March 1980. The Tamsui Line was formally closed on 15 July 1988, however, the Taiwan Railway Administration ran the route once more the next day. The Tamsui rail line was later demolished to make way for the Taipei Metro Tamsui Line, which currently operates along a route similar to that of the one occupied by the TRA Tamsui Line during its existence.

Infrastructure
The Tamsui line was a single track line with passing sidings at most stations.  Sidings range from just over 1 mile apart to the maximum distance between Zhuwei and Tamsui which was a 2.6-mile segment.  Because of the limited capacity, the maximum operable headway was every half-hour.  Passing sidings that allows trains to pass each other on the single track were located in: Shuanglien, Yuanshan, Shihlin, Peitou, and Chuwei.  Service north of Peitou was more intensive.  The entire line was token-worked; tokens (staff) must be exchanged at most stations for onwards movement authority.  Trains taking about 45 minutes to travel end-to-end sometimes had to meet as many as four trains travelling in the opposite direction.

Route Characteristics
Operating jurisdiction: Taiwan Railway Administration
Route distance: 21.2 km between Taipei and Tamsui
Gauge: 1,067 mm
Number of stations: 11 (including both terminus—number of stations remaining when line was abandoned)
Opened: 25 August 1901 opened entire line (1916 Tataocheng Station was converted to a freight-only station, the southern terminus was moved to North Gate Station; on 2 March 1923 North Gate Station was abolished, southern terminus was moved to Taipei Main Station; in 1937 the segment between Tataocheng Freight Station and Taipei Main Station was officially abandoned.)
Abolition Time: 15 July 1988 was the last day of operations; line was formally abandoned the following day, on July 16
Taiwan's first railway branch line to be connected to the trunk line network
Taiwan's first railway branch line to be converted to a mass rapid transit line

Vehicle Assignment
The regular train was hauled by R0 or R20 class diesel-electric locomotive, typically with four ordinary non-air-conditioned coaches. In the 1960s through the 1970s, S200, S300, and S400 class diesel electric locomotives commonly hauled short commuter trains on the Tamsui Line. After the project to convert East Coast Main Line to 1,067 mm gauge (from an earlier ~800 mm narrow gauge), the displaced diesel-hydraulic locomotive DH200 class was converted for a period of service on the Tamsui line.
The last train was hauled by R20-class locomotive R53, with extra passenger cars attached.

Passenger Timetables

References

See also 
 Xindian railway line

Demolished buildings and structures in Taiwan
Railway lines in Taiwan
3 ft 6 in gauge railways in Taiwan
Railway lines closed in 1988
Railway lines opened in 1901
1901 establishments in Taiwan
1988 disestablishments in Taiwan
TRA routes